Devil's Den Nature Preserve is a 280-acre (113 ha) privately-owned nature preserve in Carroll County, Virginia. 

The preserve contains rugged rock formations on a ridge side, featuring a cave or rock shelter known as Devil's Den. The property was once the Robert S. Harris farm. .

References

External links
 Virginia Department of Game and Inland Fisheries site: https://www.dgif.virginia.gov/vbwt/sites/devils-den-nature-preserve

Protected areas of Carroll County, Virginia
Nature reserves in Virginia